The Bosiljevo 2 interchange is a trumpet interchange southwest of Karlovac, Croatia, near the eponymous village. The interchange is the northern terminus of the A6 motorway and it connects the A6 route to the A1 motorway between Bosiljevo 1 and Ogulin exits. The interchange is a part of Pan-European corridor Vb. It also represents junction of European routes E65 and E71.

See also 

 Lučko interchange
 Orehovica interchange
 International E-road network
 Transport in Croatia

References

External links
Autocesta Rijeka–Zagreb: Bosiljevo 2 interchange webcam

Transport in Primorje-Gorski Kotar County
Road interchanges in Croatia